Batik is an album by the guitarist Ralph Towner, recorded in 1978 and released on the ECM label.

Reception 
The AllMusic review by Scott Yanow stated: "The music unfolds slowly but logically, and Towner's quiet sound displays a lot of inner heat... Well worth listening to closely, at a high volume".

Track listing
All compositions by Ralph Towner
 "Waterwheel" - 9:20   
 "Shades of Sutton Hoo" - 4:34   
 "Trellis" - 8:18   
 "Batik" - 16:17   
 "Green Room" - 6:16
Recorded at Talent Studios in Oslo, Norway in January 1978

Personnel 
 Ralph Towner — twelve-string guitar, classical guitar, piano
 Eddie Gómez — bass
 Jack DeJohnette — drums

References 

ECM Records albums
Ralph Towner albums
1978 albums
Albums produced by Manfred Eicher